H25 or H-25 may refer to:
 Piasecki  H-25, a helicopter formerly operated by the Canadian, French and United States militaries
 HMS H25, a United Kingdom Royal Navy submarine which saw service during World War I
and also :
 H25, a medium-format camera made by Danish company Phase One as part of their H-series line
 Senile cataract ICD-10 code

References